Sahakanuysh (10th century) was the third Queen of the Bagratid Kingdom and member of Aranshahik Dynasty. She was the wife of the third Bagratuni king - Ashot the Iron (914-928).

Sahakanuysh was the daughter of Prince of Gardman Sahak Sevada. She had two brothers - Grigor the Great, prince of Khachen (Nagorno-Karabakh Republic), and Hovhannes-Senekerim, prince of Parisos. The latter was situated in Utik province of Armenia (nowadays - Azerbaijan). Her sister Shahandukht married to Smbat Syuni, and became the first queen of Syunik kingdom.

Ashot the Iron and Sahakanuysh had no children.

Sources 
 comm. 59
 КАРАУЛОВ Н. А. Сведения арабских писателей X и XI веков по Р. Хр. о Кавказе, Армении и Адербейджане.
 К. В. Тревер. ОЧЕРКИ ПО ИСТОРИИ И КУЛЬТУРЕ КАВКАЗСКОЙ АЛБАНИИ IV В. ДО Н. Э. — VII В. Н. Э. (источники и литература). Издание Академии наук СССР, М.-Л., 1959
 comm. 144

Armenian queens consort
House of Aranshahik